PASS (the Proof of Age Standards Scheme) is a government-backed scheme in the UK that gives citizens a valid and accepted form of proof of age identification. The scheme is supported by the Home Office, the Chartered Trading Standards Institute (CTSI) and the National Police Chiefs’ Council (NPCC).
It acts as an umbrella system: it does not itself issue identification cards, but various proof of age card schemes operate under the PASS umbrella, and issue cards which bear a PASS hologram as proof of authenticity and validity.

History
Set up in 2001 to develop a recognisable way of endorsing proof of age card schemes, due to the United Kingdom not issuing a national identification card unlike in many other countries. People who didn‘t drive or travel overseas had difficulty providing any proof of age when purchasing age-restricted products; such as tobacco and alcohol.

In June 2014, the 18+ card designs were standardised (apart from the Young Scot card in Scotland), with the only real variation in appearance being the logo of the issuing organisation in the corner, citing feedback from police and retailers, in an effort to increase acceptance by venues especially in the night-time economy.

In November 2016, PASS reorganised to become a community interest company and ownership by the British Retail Consortium ended. In January 2018, the National Police Chiefs’ Council (NPCC) logo replaced the Association of Chief Police Officers' (ACPO) logo at the lower left corner of the standardised 18+ card design.

Card suppliers
 there are two types of card suppliers, national and regional. Regional cards often have requirements for residency in the area they are issued, where national cards can be obtained by anyone who can provide required information. 

There are currently three councils that offer regional cards: Bracknell Forest Council (e+ card), Milton Keynes Council (All in 1 Card) and the London Borough of Southwark ("PAL"). 

The national suppliers are CitizenCard, Post Office Ltd, TOTUM, My ID Card, and ONEID4U. The Young Scot card is available to eligible individuals resident in Scotland.

Acceptance
Proof of Age Standards Scheme's goal is to become the preferred standard in proving the age of Britons, with 5 million cards issued since 2001 and 200,000 in 2017 to 2018.
Several trade bodies currently support PASS: Association of Convenience Stores, British Beer and Pub Association, British Institute of Innkeeping, UK Hospitality and the Wine and Spirits Trade Association. In addition the Home Office, the Chartered Trading Standards Institute, National Police Chiefs' Council and Security Industry Authority also support the organisation.

It is the responsibility of retailers not to supply alcohol, tobacco, and other age-restricted products to people below the legal purchasing age. Checking a proof of age card protects them against inadvertently making sales to underage people who may look older than they really are. Some places requiring proof of age will not accept some cards, despite the PASS hologram. Retailers and licensees have the right to refuse to sell a product or deny entry to an individual even if they possess a PASS endorsed card. In 2011, more than 500,000 holders of a PASS endorsed card were refused entry to pubs and clubs. As a result, in 2014 the police and Security Industry Authority, which licences doorstaff, agreed to permit their logos to be displayed on PASS cards displaying a standardised design. In 2017, the Passport Office urged passport-holders to leave their passports at home and use a PASS card on nights out.

In 2019, PASS agreed to develop Standards for the Presentation of Digital Proof of Age with the purpose of enabling the Home Office to amend the Mandatory Licensing Conditions so that approved forms of both digital and physical proof of age could be accepted by licensees for the purpose of demonstrating due diligence.

References

External links
PASS official website
Bracknell Forest e-card
Buckinghamshire Make More card
CitizenCard
East Sussex 3i-D card
Essex BITE card
Milton Keynes All-in-1 card
YoungScot

Authentication methods
Identity documents of the United Kingdom
Age and society